Live in Colombia is a live concert performance by the Alan Parsons Symphonic Project released on double CD, triple vinyl and as a DVD on 27 May 2016 on the earMUSIC label. The show was recorded live in the Parque de los Pies Descalzos (Barefoot Park) in Medellín, Colombia on 31 August 2013.

Track listing
All songs written by Eric Woolfson and Alan Parsons.

 "I Robot" (Instrumental) – 6:24
 "Damned If I Do" (Lead vocal P.J. Olsson) – 4:33
 "Don't Answer Me" (Lead vocal Alan Parsons) – 4:36
 "Breakdown" (Lead vocal Todd Cooper) - 4:04
 "The Raven" (Lead vocal Alan Parsons) – 2:51
 "Time" (Lead vocal P.J. Olsson) – 5:29
 "I Wouldn't Want to Be Like You" (Lead vocal Alastair Greene) – 4:59
 "La Sagrada Familia" (Lead vocal Todd Cooper) – 6:04
 "I. The Turn of a Friendly Card (Part One)" (Lead vocal P.J. Olsson) – 2:53
 "II. Snake Eyes" (Lead vocal P.J. Olsson) – 3:00
 "III. The Ace of Swords" (Instrumental) – 2:47
 "IV. Nothing Left to Lose" (Lead vocal Alan Parsons) – 4:34
 "V. The Turn of a Friendly Card (Part Two)" (Lead vocal P.J. Olsson) – 4:22
 "What Goes Up..." (Lead vocal Todd Cooper) – 4:37
 "Luciferama" (Instrumental) – 5:21
 "Silence and I" (Lead vocal P.J. Olsson) – 7:46
 "Prime Time" (Lead vocal Alastair Greene) – 6:34
 "Intermezzo" (Instrumental) – 1:38
 "Sirius" (Instrumental) – 2:12 
 "Eye in the Sky" (Lead vocal Alan Parsons) – 5:11
 "Old and Wise" (Lead vocal P.J. Olsson) – 5:39
 "Games People Play" (Lead Vocal P.J. Olsson) – 4:54

Personnel
Alan Parsons – keyboards, guitar, vocals, producer
P.J. Olsson – vocals, guitar
Guy Erez – bass, vocals
Alastair Greene – guitar, vocals
Todd Cooper – saxophone, guitar, percussion, vocals
Danny Thompson – drums, vocals
Tom Brooks – keyboards, vocals
Alejandro Posada – orchestra and choir conductor

References

Alan Parsons albums
Concept albums
2016 albums
Albums produced by Alan Parsons